Sisyrinchium bellum, the western blue-eyed grass or Californian blue-eyed grass, is the common blue-eyed grass of California and Oregon in and west of the Sierra Nevada, its range extending south into Baja California. In parts of its range, western blue-eyed grass has previously been classified as Sisyrinchium eastwoodiae, S. greenei and S. hesperium, but these names are now considered synonyms.

Like other species of blue-eyed grasses that are locally dominant, it is generally known simply as "blue-eyed grass" within its natural range.

Description
Its leaves are grassy and tufted. It flowers from March to July with a peak in April. Dried in air, its seeds weigh between 1 and 4 mg. After flowering, it dies to the ground and is dormant over the summer.

Cultivation
Sisyrinchium bellum prefers some moisture and good drainage, but will tolerate summer dryness. It can be propagated by seed, and it self-sows. It can also be propagated by division of its rhizomes, and the flower stems can be rooted.

Uses
The Ohlone used an infusion of the roots and leaves as a cure for indigestion and stomach pain, and similar uses are recorded from other Native American peoples.

References

 Harlow, Nora, Jakob, Kristin, and Raiche, Roger (2003) "Wild Lilies, Irises, and Grasses". University of California Press. .

External links

  Jepson Manual Treatment  - Sisyrinchium bellum
 USDA PLANTS: Sisyrinchium bellum
 

bellum
Flora of California
Flora of Oregon
Flora of Baja California
Flora of the Sierra Nevada (United States)
Flora of the California desert regions
Plants used in traditional Native American medicine
Garden plants of North America
Drought-tolerant plants
Flora of North America
Flora without expected TNC conservation status